Jiang, formerly romanized chiang and usually translated general, is a rank held by general officers in the armed forces of both the People's Republic of China (mainland China) and the Republic of China on Taiwan. The People's Liberation Army and the People's Armed Police use three levels at present while the Republic of China Armed Forces use four.

In both North and South Korea, the same rank is also used but typically romanized as jang. In Japan, the same character is read shō.

Chinese variant

People's Liberation Army 
The same rank names are used for all services, prefixed by haijun or kongjun.

This rank was awarded to 10 of the veteran leaders of the PLA in 1955 and never conferred again. The decision to name the equivalent rank  when it was briefly re-established in 1988-1994 was likely due to a desire to keep the rank of  an honorary one awarded after a war, much as General of the Armies in the United States Army. It was offered to Deng Xiaoping who declined the new rank. Thus it was never conferred and scrapped in 1994.

Republic of China Armed Forces

Japanese variant

Korean variant

North Korea

South Korea

See also 
Xiao (rank)
Wei (rank)
Shi (rank)
 Ranks of the People's Liberation Army Ground Force
 Ranks of the People's Liberation Army Navy
 Ranks of the People's Liberation Army Air Force
 Ranks of the People's Armed Police
 Republic of China Armed Forces rank insignia

References 

Jiang
Military ranks of the People's Republic of China
Military of the Republic of China